Danny McCormick is an American politician and businessman serving as a member of the Louisiana House of Representatives from the 1st district. Elected in November 2019, he assumed office on January 13, 2020.

Early life and education 
McCormick was born in Shreveport, Louisiana. He graduated from North Caddo High School and attended McNeese State University.

Career 
McCormick is the founder of M&M Oil. He was elected to the Louisiana House of Representatives in November 2019 and assumed office on January 13, 2020. In September 2020, McCormick was criticized after posting a meme on Facebook that featured an antisemitic canard conspiracy theory.

McCormick voted for and supports a draft Louisiana state bill that would make in vitro fertilization (IVF) treatments and some forms of birth control a crime, and prosecute women who get abortions for murder.  The draft bill has no exceptions for rape, incest, or the protection of the life of the mother.

Personal life 
McCormick and his wife, Susan, have two children. He lives in Oil City, Louisiana.

References

Living people
North Caddo High School alumni
People from Shreveport, Louisiana
People from Caddo Parish, Louisiana
Republican Party members of the Louisiana House of Representatives
Year of birth missing (living people)